Packets that hold Internet Protocol data carry a 4-bit IP version number as the first field of its header. Currently, only IPv4 and IPv6 packets are seen on the Internet, having IP version numbers 4 and 6, respectively.

IP version numbers
As the version number is carried in a 4-bit field, only numbers 0-15 can be assigned.

History
During the development of the first version of the Internet Protocol in the 1970s, the initial experimental versions 1 to 3 were not standardized. The first working version that was widely deployed was assigned version number 4.

A separate protocol based on reliable connections was developed and assigned version 5.

IP version 7 was chosen in 1988 by R. Ullmann as the next IP version because he incorrectly assumed that version 6 was in use for ST-II. However, ST-II had reused version 5 of the original ST protocol.

In the early 1990s, when it became apparent that IPv4 could not sustain routing in a growing Internet, several new Internet Protocols were proposed. The Internet Protocol that finally emerged was assigned version number 6, being the lowest free number greater than 4.

The PIP protocol and TUBA protocol used versions 8 and 9, following version 7 for TP/IX.

In 2004, an IPv9 protocol was developed in China using 256-bit addresses.

References

Internet Protocol
IPv4 protocol numbers.